Putative RNA-binding protein Luc7-like 1 is a protein that in humans is encoded by the LUC7L gene.

The LUC7L gene may represent a mammalian heterochromatic gene, encoding a putative RNA-binding protein similar to the yeast Luc7p subunit of the U1 snRNP splicing complex that is normally required for 5-prime splice site selection.

References

Further reading